"Playas Gon' Play" is the second and final single from American girl group 3LW's self-titled debut album (2000). The single was released in April 2001. Although the song was a favorite among fans, it peaked at only number 81 on the Billboard Hot 100. It performed moderately on the UK Singles Chart, where it peaked at number 21. In 2017, Billboard named the song number 89 on their list of "100 Greatest Girl Group Songs of All Time". The song featured lead vocals by Naturi Naughton.

Music video

The video was directed by Darren Grant. It starts with the girls being dropped of at a tropical beach resort. Once they have been dropped off, they change into their bikinis and walk through the resort. As they walk through the resort, boys are looking at them. Throughout the video are scenes of the girls hanging out on a balcony watching over the resort. Another portion of the video shows the girls performing a dance routine in front on the pond at the resort at night. The video received decent video play on TV channels such as BET and MTV and enjoyed some success on BET's 106 & Park and MTV's TRL.

Track listings

US CD single
 "Playas Gon' Play" (album version) – 4:40
 "Playas Gon' Play" (instrumental) – 4:43
 "Playas Gon' Play" (a cappella) – 4:37
 "Never Let Em' Go" (album version) – 3:46
 "Never Let Em' Go" (remix) – 4:04

UK CD single
 "Playas Gon' Play" (radio edit) – 3:40
 "Playas Gon' Play" (8 Jam Street mix) – 5:08
 "Playas Gon' Play" (System 3 Step mix) – 6:11
 "Playas Gon' Play" (video) – 3:48

UK cassette single
 "Playas Gon' Play" (radio edit) – 3:40
 "Playas Gon' Play" (8 Jam Street mix) – 5:08
 "Dear Diary" – 4:15

Australian CD single
 "Playas Gon' Play" (radio edit) – 3:40
 "Playas Gon' Play" (Street mix) – 5:15
 "Playas Gon' Play" (System 3 Step mix) – 6:11
 "No More (Baby I'ma Do Right)" (8 Jam Street mix) – 5:08

Charts

Release history

Lawsuit
In 2017, "Playas Gon' Play" writers Sean Hall and Nathan Butler filed a lawsuit accusing Taylor Swift of copyright infringement because Swift's 2014 song "Shake It Off" features the lyrics "the players gonna play, play, play, play, play and the haters gonna hate, hate, hate, hate, hate." Swift claimed in a 2022 declaration that she had never heard "Playas Gon' Play" or anything else by 3LW prior to writing "Shake It Off," rather, the first time she heard the song was after the claim was made against her. Swift also pointed out other songs that use similar phrasing and said the concept is common phrasing, whereas Hall and Butler claimed the phrasing, while common in recent years, was unique at the time they wrote the song. On December 12, 2022, the lawsuit was dropped with no final verdict.

References

2000 songs
2001 singles
3LW songs
Epic Records singles
Music videos directed by Darren Grant
Songs written by Nate Butler